Timur Yanyalı (born August 26, 1975) is a Turkish former footballer who played as a defender.

In the 2000–01 season he was suspended from football after doping test.

References

External links
 

Living people
1975 births
Association football defenders
Turkish footballers
Turkey under-21 international footballers
Turkey youth international footballers
Bundesliga players
TSV 1860 Munich players
TSV 1860 Munich II players
Footballers from Munich
İstanbulspor footballers
Adanaspor footballers
Doping cases in association football
Turkish sportspeople in doping cases
Süper Lig players